Michael Carroll Whitwell (born November 14, 1958) is a former American football player who played two seasons with the Cleveland Browns of the National Football League (NFL). He was drafted by the Browns in the sixth round of the 1982 NFL Draft. He played college football at Texas A&M University and attended Cotulla High School in Cotulla, Texas.

References

External links
Just Sports Stats
College stats

Living people
1958 births
Players of American football from Texas
American football defensive backs
American football wide receivers
Texas A&M Aggies football players
Cleveland Browns players
People from Kenedy, Texas